The ENP Bridge over Green River is a historic bridge located near Daniel, Wyoming, which carries Sublette County Road CN23-145 across the Green River. The Western Bridge and Construction Company built the bridge circa 1905. The  bridge has two spans, both Pratt trusses; the longer span is a Pratt through truss, while the shorter is a Pratt pony truss. The use of both through and pony trusses in the same bridge was uncommon in Wyoming, and the bridge is the only surviving example of a Pratt truss bridge in this style.

The bridge was added to the National Register of Historic Places on February 22, 1985. It was one of several bridges added to the NRHP for its role in the history of Wyoming bridge construction.

See also
List of bridges documented by the Historic American Engineering Record in Wyoming

References

External links

Road bridges on the National Register of Historic Places in Wyoming
Buildings and structures in Sublette County, Wyoming
Historic American Engineering Record in Wyoming
National Register of Historic Places in Sublette County, Wyoming
Pratt truss bridges in the United States